10 Songs is the ninth studio album by the Scottish band Travis, released on 9 October 2020. The album sees singer Fran Healy return to the role of primary songwriter for the first time since 2003's 12 Memories.

Critical reception

10 Songs received generally favourable reviews from music critics. At Metacritic, which assigns a normalised rating out of 100 to reviews from mainstream critics, the album received an average score of 78, based on 6 reviews.

Track listing

Japanese bonus track

Charts

References

2020 albums
Travis (band) albums
Albums recorded at RAK Studios